Esquina is a city in Corrientes Province, Argentina. It is the capital of the Esquina Department.

History
The city of Esquina was found by Benito Lamela in 1806, who gave the name to the city. In April 2016, a major flood caused a large portion of the city to be underwater. Over 300 people were evacuated, and the height of floodwaters reached at least  in some neighborhoods.

Festivals

In January and February, many tourists visit Esquina to enjoy the street carnivals.

In March, the town hosts the Fiesta Nacional del Pacú, a fishing competition which attracts around 25,000 visitors.

Famous people 

Both parents of Diego Maradona was raised in Esquina.

See also

Esquina Department

References

External links

 Municipal website
 Local news in Esquina, Corrientes

Populated places in Corrientes Province
Corrientes Province
Cities in Argentina
Argentina